Manjeet Singh Panesar (born 21 February 1962) is a Kenyan field hockey player. He competed in the men's tournament at the 1984 Summer Olympics.

References

External links
 

1962 births
Living people
Kenyan male field hockey players
Olympic field hockey players of Kenya
Field hockey players at the 1984 Summer Olympics
Sportspeople from Nairobi
Kenyan people of Indian descent
Kenyan people of Punjabi descent